Dharmapuri railway station (station code: DPJ) is situated in the central part of the Dharmapuri city, which is the headquarters of the Dharmapuri district of Tamil Nadu. It has been administered by the South Western Railway zone, included in the Bangalore railway division that was transferred over from the Southern Railway zone.It is one of the main halt in northwest tamilnadu. Every train passing through this route has a stop here.

Location and layout
The junction is located on Duraisamy Gounder Street in the railway station road situated at close proximity to the Rural/Urban Bus Terminals, Collector Office, City Market, City Bazaar, TNSTC bus depot and the Taluk office and just  from Govt Dharmapuri Medical College and Hospital and just  from Adhiyaman Kottai.

The station is eco-friendly with many trees. It is a part of the – railway line. It is the main stop for the trains passing through the line. Dharmapuri station is a junction (Station code itself indicates DPJ), at that time it was under Southern Railways and had been connected with Chennai, via Morappur by metre-gauge; as like as now connected with Bangalore, via Hosur. After reforming the zones of Indian Railways, its Chennai route had been abandoned and came under South Western Railways. It is undertaken by Bangalore railway division.

Train service
The station has passenger and freight train services to cater the needs of the region surrounded by. Some of them include the following.
1. Garib rath express ( Premium service).
2. Intercity Superfast express (Day time service).
3. Mail and express  service.
4. MEMU service
5. unreserved Passenger service

References

1. https://www.newindianexpress.com/states/tamil-nadu/2022/jun/18/land-acquisition-work-initiated-for-dharmapuri-morappur-railway-line-2466933.html
 2. https://timesofindia.indiatimes.com/city/coimbatore/new-railway-line-to-link-morappur-and-dharmapuri-save-81km/articleshow/68261988.cms

External links

Bangalore railway division
Railway stations in Dharmapuri district
Railway stations opened in 1906
1906 establishments in India